Kay Cannon (born August 21, 1974) is an American screenwriter, producer, director, and actress. She is best known for writing and producing the Pitch Perfect film series (2012–2017). She made her directorial debut with the comedy film Blockers (2018). 
Cannon was also a writer and producer for the NBC comedy series 30 Rock (2007–2012) and the FOX comedy series New Girl (2012–2014). She created, wrote and produced the short-lived Netflix comedy-drama series Girlboss (2017).

Early life
Kay Cannon was raised in Custer Park, Illinois, and is the fifth of seven children. She graduated from Reed-Custer High School in Braidwood, Illinois, and received her BA in Theatre and MA in Education at Lewis University in Romeoville, Illinois.

Career

Acting
Cannon trained at The Second City, ImprovOlympic, and ComedySportz. One of her first jobs was as a performer at ComedySportz.

She has performed sketch and improv for theaters including Boom Chicago in Amsterdam, Netherlands, The Second City in Chicago and Las Vegas, ImprovOlympic (West and Chicago) and at The Upright Citizens Brigade Theatre in Los Angeles and New York City.

Cannon starred in the independent film The Little Tin Man (2013). She has guest-starred on NBC's 30 Rock, New Girl, and Cristela.

She made a cameo in Pitch Perfect 2 (2015) and also appeared in the comedy How to Be Single (2016), starring Rebel Wilson and Dakota Johnson.

Writing
While performing and writing around Chicago, she met actress Tina Fey, a fellow Second City alumna. When Fey began creating the NBC comedy 30 Rock, she brought Cannon to the writing staff. She worked her way up from staff writer to supervising producer.

Cannon won the Writers Guild of America Award for Best Comedic Series for her work on 30 Rock three times. In 2008, she won a Peabody Award for her work on the show. In 2010, Cannon was nominated for an Emmy Award for Outstanding Writing in a Comedy Series. During this time, Cannon also worked as a co-producer on the feature film, Baby Mama (2008).

She moved from New York City to Los Angeles when she signed an overall development deal with 20th Century Fox. Within that deal, she worked as a co-executive producer on New Girl and as a consulting producer on Cristela. As part of her development, Cannon sold a workplace comedy, The Wrecking Crew, to Fox and wrote the pilot The Runt for CBS.

She then created, executive produced the show Girlboss for Netflix based on the real life of Sophia Amoruso.

Cannon's first produced feature screenplay was the a cappella comedy Pitch Perfect (2012). She wrote and co-produced the film's sequels, Pitch Perfect 2 (2015) and Pitch Perfect 3 (2017).

Directing
Cannon made her directorial debut with Blockers. The film was released by Universal Pictures on April 6, 2018. On April 9, 2019, it was announced that Cannon would write and direct a musical reimagining of Cinderella for Sony Pictures, starring Camila Cabello and produced by James Corden and his production company, Fullwell 73.

Personal life
In 2004, Cannon married actor and comedian Jason Sudeikis after five years together. They separated in 2008 and divorced in 2010.

Cannon and her second husband, comedy writer Eben Russell, had a daughter in October 2013.

Filmography
Films

Television

See also
 List of female film and television directors
 List of LGBT-related films directed by women

References

External links
 

21st-century American actresses
Actresses from Chicago
Film producers from Illinois
American television actresses
Television producers from Illinois
American women television producers
American television writers
American women screenwriters
Lewis University alumni
Living people
People from Will County, Illinois
Place of birth missing (living people)
American women film producers
American women television writers
Writers from Chicago
Writers Guild of America Award winners
Upright Citizens Brigade Theater performers
1974 births
Screenwriters from Illinois
Comedians from Illinois
21st-century American comedians
21st-century American screenwriters